Tullyroan is a townland lying within the civil parish of Kilcronaghan, County Londonderry, Northern Ireland. It lies in the centre of the parish and is bounded by the townlands of: Brackaghlislea, Calmore, Cloughfin, Coolsaragh, Gortahurk, Tamnyaskey. It wasn't apportioned to any of the London livery companies, being kept as church lands.

The townland was part of the Tobermore electoral ward of the former Magherafelt District Council, however in 1926 it was part of Tobermore district electoral division as part of the Maghera division of Magherafelt Rural District. It was also part of the former barony of Loughinsholin.

Etymology
The townland of Tullyroan is derived from the Irish Tulaigh Uí Ruáin meaning "O'Rowan's hill". Tulaigh (or Tulach), which means "hillock/hill" likely refers to Belmount Hill which is in this townland. The second element could be of several different origins such as ruán in the sense of buckwheat, which grew well on small hills, or in the sense of red land or soil, of which Tullyroan contains a considerable amount of heath especially around Belmount Hill. Despite this it is postulated that it in fact derives from the name O'Rowan, a name found in western Ireland, however in the 1663 Hearth Money Rolls, a "Knogher O'Rome" (read as O'Roine) is recorded within this parish.

Belmount Hill in this townland is derived from the French Bel Mont, meaning "beautiful mountain".

History
Along with the townlands of Granny, Mormeal, and Tamnyaskey, Tullyroan comprises the four townlands that make up the Bishop of Derrys lands in the parish. Prior to the Plantation of Ulster, these four townlands constituted the termon (or erenagh) land of the parish, and were known as "Ballintrolla, Derreskerdan, Dirrygrinagh et Kellynahawla". Despite these townlands being in the same location as the later townlands, it is now impossible to match their names accurately.

Statistics

See also

Kilcronaghan
List of townlands in Tobermore
Tobermore

References

Townlands of County Londonderry
Civil parish of Kilcronaghan